Baron Churchill, of Wychwood in the County of Oxford, is a title in the Peerage of the United Kingdom and held by a branch of the Spencer family. It was created in 1815 for Lord Francis Spencer, younger son of the 4th Duke of Marlborough (see Duke of Marlborough for earlier history of the family). He had previously represented Oxfordshire in Parliament.

From 1902 to 2017, the barony was subsidiary title of the viscountcy of Churchill. The title of Viscount Churchill, of Rolleston in the County of Leicester, was created in the Peerage of the United Kingdom on 15 July 1902 for the first baron's grandson Conservative politician Victor Spencer, 3rd Baron Churchill. The viscountcy became extinct in 2017 on the death of the first Viscount's youngest son, the third Viscount, who had succeeded his half-brother, the second Viscount, in 1973.

The barony was inherited by the last Viscount's second cousin once removed, the great-grandson of General Sir Augustus Almeric Spencer, the third son of the 1st Baron Churchill.

Baron Churchill (1815)
Francis Almeric Spencer, 1st Baron Churchill (1779–1845)
Francis George Spencer, 2nd Baron Churchill (1802–1886)
Victor Albert Francis Charles Spencer, 3rd Baron Churchill (1864–1934, created Viscount Churchill in 1902)

Viscount Churchill (1902)
Victor Albert Francis Charles Spencer, 1st Viscount Churchill (1864–1934)
Victor Alexander Spencer, 2nd Viscount Churchill (1890–1973)
Victor George Spencer, 3rd Viscount Churchill (1934–2017)

Baron Churchill (1815; reverted)
Richard Harry Ramsay Spencer, 6th Baron Churchill (1926–2020)
Michael Richard de Charrière Spencer, 7th Baron Churchill (born 1960)

The heir presumptive is the present holder's brother, the Hon. David Anthony de Charrière Spencer (born 1970).

Male-line family tree

References

Books
 Alt URL

External links

See also
Duke of Marlborough
Earl Spencer

Baronies in the Peerage of the United Kingdom
Noble titles created in 1815
Noble titles created for UK MPs
Baron